Serhiy Stanislavovych Rebrov (born 3 June 1974) is a Ukrainian professional football manager and former player who played as a striker. He is in charge of UAE Pro League side Al-Ain.

Rebrov gained international fame as an attacking partner of Andriy Shevchenko at Dynamo Kyiv throughout the 1990s and as of August 2017 is the all-time top scorer of the Ukrainian Premier League together with Maksim Shatskikh.

From his debut in 1992, he was capped 75 times by Ukraine, scoring 15 goals. He played in the nation's first-ever World Cup, in 2006.

He finished his career as a professional football player in 2009, after which he worked as a coach. In 2014 he held the position of acting head coach at Dynamo Kyiv, and for the next three years he was head coach. He was the first to win the Ukrainian Cup as a player and coach. He also spent three seasons as manager of Hungarian side Ferencváros from 2018 to 2021.

Club career
Rebrov was born in Horlivka, Donetsk Oblast. He joined Shakhtar Donetsk as a youth in 1990. In his debut 1991 season, then a 17-year-old, he scored two goals in seven games in the USSR Premier League. In his second season, playing in the newly established Ukrainian Premier League, he became a joint 3rd goalscorer, catching the eye of Dynamo Kyiv scouts.

Dynamo Kyiv
Rebrov moved to Dynamo Kyiv in August 1992 and has since become the highest all-time scorer in the Ukrainian Premier League. His total tally in the league with Shakhtar and Dynamo is 123 goals in 261 games.

He scored several key goals in European competitions, notably in the 1997–98 and 1998–99 seasons of the UEFA Champions League, including a famous goal against Barcelona from a tight angle. Dynamo reached the Champions League semi-final in 1999 but lost to Bayern Munich on aggregate. In the 1999–2000 season, Rebrov became a joint top scorer in the UEFA Champions League with 10 goals (including 2 goals in qualification games) as Dynamo progressed to the last sixteen before going out on head-to-head record against Real Madrid.

England
On 17 May 2000, he was transferred to Tottenham Hotspur for £11 million, where he managed a modest return of 9 goals in 29 games over his first Premier League season, appearing to struggle to adjust to the different style of play in England. Things grew worse for Rebrov after the sacking of George Graham in March 2001, as he was frozen out by new manager Glenn Hoddle, with extremely few first-team starts or substitute appearances. In search of first-team football, Rebrov spent two consecutive loan spells to Fenerbahçe. In his second season there, alongside new signing Pierre van Hooijdonk he helped lead Fenerbahçe to its 15th title.

Subsequently, Rebrov signed a one-year contract with West Ham United in the Championship after his contract with Tottenham expired. He scored just once in the league for West Ham, the winner in a 3–2 win over Watford on 27 November 2004. He also scored once in the League Cup against Notts County.

Return to Dynamo Kyiv
On 1 June 2005, Rebrov became a free agent after declining to re-sign and two days later he signed a new two-year contract with Dynamo Kyiv, with the option of a one-year extension. In the new 2005–06 season, Rebrov became Dynamo's top scorer with 13 goals, two behind league joint top scorers Brandão and Okoduwa, despite playing in midfield. Rebrov also topped the league in points, with goals and assists – and was named player of the season according to a poll of team managers and captains.

In July 2007, Rebrov became Dynamo's captain. In the 2007–08 season, he was mostly benched, starting only seven out of eighteen matches before the winter break. His contribution in some games was heavily criticised by the press. It was reported that Rebrov could move to Arsenal Kyiv during the transfer window. However, under new manager Yuri Semin, Rebrov started all games and was named best player at the close season Channel One Cup. In February 2008, Dynamo president Ihor Surkis stated that the club was planning talks with Rebrov with a view of extending his contract. Shortly thereafter, Rebrov received an offer of a two-year contract from Russian Premier League club Rubin Kazan.

Rubin Kazan

On 3 March 2008, Dynamo announced that Rebrov had signed a two-year contract with Rubin Kazan and would join the new club at the end of the season, in summer 2008. With the Russian season starting in spring, Rubin eventually agreed to a $1 million compensation with Dynamo for Rebrov's early release from his contract. He was part of the team that won the 2008 Russian Premier League for the first time in Rubin's history, playing in midfield in 24 out of his team's 30 league matches and scoring 5 goals.

Retirement
Rebrov's retirement was announced on 20 July 2009. At the same time, he became an assistant manager at the Dynamo Kyiv reserves team. During his career, he played in various European Leagues with 423 games recorded and 145 goals netted. His career achievements resulted in him being inducted into the Viktor Leonenko Hall of Fame in March 2012.

In August 2009 Rebrov made a brief return to football, by joining amateur club FC Irpin Horenychi from the Kyiv suburbs. He took part in the 2009-10 Ukrainian Cup where Irpin lost to FC Volyn Lutsk. In the fall of the same year, Rebrov also played a couple of games for Irpin in Mykolaiv Oblast in the 2009 Amateur League.<ref>Oleksiy Komarovskyi. Anatoliy Bezsmertnyi: We respect everyone and of nobody we are afraid (Анатолій БЕЗСМЕРТНИЙ: «Всіх поважаємо і нікого не боїмося»). Sport.ua. 17 August 2010</ref>

Managerial career
On 17 April 2014, Rebrov was named caretaker manager of Dynamo Kyiv. On 19 May, after the victory in the Ukrainian cup, he was named manager.

Dynamo Kyiv
During Rebrov's reign as manager, Dynamo Kyiv went on to win two Ukrainian Premier League titles, two Ukrainian Cup titles, one Ukrainian Super Cup. In the 2015–16 season, the team also progressed past the group stages of the UEFA Champions League for the first time in over 15 years, into the knockout rounds. The season before Rebrov lead Dynamo Kyiv in a successful 2014–15 UEFA Europa League campaign, which included a memorable 5–2 win over Everton in the Round of 16-second leg. Rebrov confirmed his resignation as manager on 31 May 2017 following his contract expiry, after the club's final game of the season, against Chornomorets Odessa.

Al Ahli Saudi FC
Rebrov soon returned to management and in June 2017, Rebrov was named manager of Saudi Arabia side Al Ahli. He managed there for one season, until he was eventually sacked for failing to win the league. 

Ferencváros
On 22 August 2018, Rebrov was named manager of Hungarian side Ferencváros after the club failed to qualify for the UEFA Europa League.

On 29 September 2020, Rebrov guided Ferencváros into the Champions League group stage for the first time in a quarter of a century after beating Molde FK. The Green Eagles beat Djurgårdens IF, Celtic F.C. and Dinamo Zagreb in the previous three rounds of qualification to set up a meeting with the Norwegian champions. After a 3–3 draw in Norway in the first leg, Ferencváros held out for a 0–0 draw in Budapest in the second leg, which meant a victory on away goals and thus qualification to the promised land of the group stage was secured for the first time in 25 years.

On 4 June 2021, Ferencváros announced his resignation as coach of the club, thanking him for his contribution to winning three consecutive league titles and for reaching the club both to the UEFA Europa League group stage, in 2019, and to the Champions League group stage, in the following year.

Al-Ain

On 7 June 2021, Al Ain FC from the United Arab Emirates announced his appointment as manager.

International career
Rebrov scored Ukraine's first-ever World Cup goal in their opening 1998 FIFA World Cup qualification group 9 match in 1996, against Northern Ireland. The match in Belfast finished 1–0 thanks to Rebrov's contribution. Ukraine finished 2nd in the group behind Germany, with Rebrov again scoring the winner in another 1–0 victory away to Albania in March 1997, and at home to the same team in August. His three goals helped his team into the playoffs, where they lost 3–1 on aggregate to Croatia.

Rebrov's club exploits earned him a recall to the national team and a ticket to the 2006 FIFA World Cup in Germany, where he scored a long-range shot against Saudi Arabia as Ukraine progressed to the quarterfinals before going down to Italy.

At the time of his retirement on 20 July 2009, he was the fourth most capped player in the Ukrainian national team's history having represented his country 75 times and was their second all-time scorer with 15 goals.

Personal life
Rebrov is a licensed amateur radio operator and an active contester and has been active with the following callsigns: UT5UDX (Ukraine), M0SDX (England), TA2ZF (Turkey) and UT0U(Ukrainian contest-callsign). Most recent call is 5B4AMM (Cyprus).

Career statistics

Club

InternationalScores and results list Ukraine's goal tally first, score column indicates score after each Rebrov goal.''

Managerial statistics

Honours

Player
Dynamo Kyiv
 Vyshcha Liha (9): 1992–93, 1993–94, 1994–95, 1995–96, 1996–97, 1997–98, 1998–99, 1999–2000, 2006–07
 Ukrainian Cup (7): 1992–93, 1995–96, 1997–98, 1998–99, 1999–2000, 2005–06, 2006–07
 Ukrainian Super Cup: 2006

Fenerbahçe
 Süper Lig: 2003–04

West Ham United
Football League Championship play-offs:  2005

Rubin Kazan
 Russian Premier League: 2008, 2009

Manager
Dynamo Kyiv
 Ukrainian Premier League: 2014–15, 2015–16
 Ukrainian Cup: 2013–14, 2014–15
 Ukrainian Super Cup: 2016

Ferencváros
 Nemzeti Bajnokság I: 2018–19, 2019–20, 2020–21

Al Ain
 UAE Pro League: 2021–22
 UAE League Cup: 2021–22

Individual
 Ukrainian Footballer of the Year: 1996, 1998
 Ukrainian Premier League Player of the Season: 1996, 1998, 1999
 Ukrainian Premier League top scorer: 1997–98
 Ukrainian Premier League Joint All-Time top scorer (alongside Maksim Shatskikh): 123 goals in 261 matches 
 Channel One Cup - Player of tournament 2008
 Ferencváros Manager of the Decade: 2020
 UAE Pro League Manager of the Month: August 2021, September 2021, October 2021, November 2021, December 2021, January 2022, February 2022, March 2022

References

External links

 
 
 Profile at Dynamo Kyiv official website (fcdynamo.kiev.ua)
 Profile at Football Ukraine website (fanatukr.com)

1974 births
People from Horlivka
Living people
Serhiy Bubka College of Olympic Reserve alumni
Soviet footballers
Ukrainian footballers
Ukrainian expatriate footballers
Expatriate footballers in England
Expatriate footballers in Turkey
Expatriate footballers in Russia
Ukrainian expatriate sportspeople in England
Ukrainian expatriate sportspeople in Turkey
Ukrainian expatriate sportspeople in Russia
2006 FIFA World Cup players
Ukraine international footballers
FC Shakhtar Donetsk players
FC Dynamo Kyiv players
Tottenham Hotspur F.C. players
Fenerbahçe S.K. footballers
West Ham United F.C. players
FC Rubin Kazan players
FC Irpin Horenychi players
Premier League players
English Football League players
Süper Lig players
Soviet Top League players
Russian Premier League players
Ukrainian Premier League players
Ukrainian Amateur Football Championship players
Ukrainian Premier League managers
FC Dynamo Kyiv managers
Ukrainian football managers
Ukrainian Premier League top scorers
Association football forwards
Ukrainian expatriate football managers
Al-Ahli Saudi FC managers
Expatriate football managers in Saudi Arabia
Saudi Professional League managers
Ukrainian expatriate sportspeople in Saudi Arabia
Ferencvárosi TC managers
Expatriate football managers in Hungary
Ukrainian expatriate sportspeople in Hungary
Al Ain FC managers
UAE Pro League managers
Expatriate football managers in the United Arab Emirates
Ukrainian expatriate sportspeople in the United Arab Emirates
Amateur radio people
Ukrainian people of Russian descent
Nemzeti Bajnokság I managers
Sportspeople from Donetsk Oblast